Alexia Arthurs is a writer who grew up in both Jamaica and the United States of America. She writes about the variability of experiences of black identity of immigrants from African countries, Jamaica, and other countries of the West Indies from recent immigrants to those brought over during slavery. Her writings include short stories about community, generations, mermaids, sexuality and more. She is a recipient of the Plimpton Prize and an O. Henry Prize.

Life
Arthurs graduated from the Iowa Writers' Workshop. Arthurs was awarded the 2017 Paris Review Plimpton Prize. Her first book, How To Love A Jamaican: Stories, was published in 2018 and was identified by Entertainment Weekly, Buzzfeed News, and Bitch Media as one of the best Summer reads of 2018. Arthurs teaches at the Iowa Writers' Workshop.

Works

References

External links 
 The Jamaican-American Immigrant Experience, WNYC, August 14, 2018

Living people
21st-century American short story writers
21st-century American women writers
American writers of Jamaican descent
Iowa Writers' Workshop alumni
Iowa Writers' Workshop faculty
Year of birth missing (living people)
Place of birth missing (living people)
American women short story writers